Christine Anne Coverdale is an American plasma physicist at Sandia National Laboratories, where she is a Distinguished Member of the Technical Staff.

Education and career
Coverdale earned a Ph.D. in plasma physics from the University of California, Davis, in 1995, based on research performed at the Lawrence Livermore National Laboratory.

After working briefly for Physics International, she joined Sandia National Laboratories in 1997, initially working on the Z Pulsed Power Facility. Her research at Sandia also involves the certification of nuclear weapons and radiation detection of X-rays from plasma Z-pinch confinement. She was named a Distinguished Member of the Technical Staff at Sandia in 2011.

Recognition
Coverdale was elected as a Fellow of the American Physical Society (APS) in 2008, after a nomination from the APS Division of Plasma Physics, "for exceptional experimental achievements in both laser and z-pinch plasma physics, dedicated service to the professional community, and leadership in promoting laboratory and university collaborations". She became an IEEE Fellow in 2010, "for contributions to the development of neutron sources".

In 2016, she won the Prism Award of the Society of Women Engineers and the
IEEE Plasma Science and Applications Committee Award, becoming the first woman to win this award.

References

Year of birth missing (living people)
Living people
American physicists
American women physicists
University of California, Davis alumni
Sandia National Laboratories people
Fellows of the American Physical Society
Fellow Members of the IEEE
21st-century American women